Caroline Adoch is a Ugandan lawyer and human rights advocate. She is the first woman to hold a Doctorate of Law (LL.D) degree from Makerere University which was awarded to her on the 23rd May 2022.

Education 
Adoch attended St. Agnes Catholic Girl's Primary Boarding School Naggalama, where she attained her Primary Leaving Examination Certificate. She attended Mount St. Mary's Namagunga for both her O-level and A-level education. She attended the University of Dar es Salaam for her Bachelorss of Laws from 2004 to 2007, and attained her Master's degree of Laws (LL.M) in 2010 from the University of Cambridge in the United Kingdom after being awarded a Commonwealth Scholarship. She attained a Doctor of Laws (LL.D) from Makerere University on the 23rd May 2022, making her the first woman to attain a Doctor of Laws (LL.D) from the university.

Her doctoral thesis was titled "Access to Gender Justice in Uganda: A Feminist Analysis of Experience of Rape victims in the Reporting and Prosecution Process" which Professor Sylvia Tamale supervised.

Career 
In 2012, Adoch joined Makerere University's School of Law as a teaching assistant. She later became an assistant lecturer at the same university where she lectured courses that included human rights, public internal law, administrative law and constitutional law. In March 2019, She became the senior associate at CivSource.

See also 
Sylvia Tamale

References

External links 
 Studocu

Living people
21st-century Ugandan lawyers
Ugandan women lawyers
Ugandan human rights activists
University of Dar es Salaam alumni
Alumni of the University of Cambridge
Makerere University alumni
Academic staff of Makerere University
Year of birth missing (living people)